Pakalniškis is a Lithuanian language family name.

The surname may refer to:

Saulius Pakalniškis, Lithuanian zoologist, entomologist and dipterologist
Vytautas Pakalniškis (:lt:Vytautas Pakalniškis), Lithuanian lawyer and politician

Lithuanian-language surnames